Abdessamad Rafik  (born 8 April 1982 in Khouribga) is a former Moroccan footballer.

His former clubs are Wydad Casablanca and Olympique Khouribga.

References

External links 

 Player profile - wydad.com

1982 births
Living people
Association football midfielders
Moroccan footballers
Wydad AC players
Association Salé players
People from Khouribga
Olympic Club de Safi players
Moghreb Tétouan players
Al-Wehda Club (Mecca) players
Olympique Club de Khouribga players
Ittihad Tanger players
Morocco international footballers
2014 African Nations Championship players
Morocco A' international footballers